Gateway Center may refer to:

Gateway Center Arena, a multi-purpose arena in the College Park, Georgia, Gateway Center commercial complex
Gateway Center (PAT station), a station in Pittsburgh, Pennsylvania
Gateway Center (Pittsburgh), a building complex in Pittsburgh, Pennsylvania
Gateway Center (Collinsville), a convention center in Collinsville, Illinois
Gateway Center (Newark), a commercial complex in Newark, New Jersey
Gateway Center or South Bay Tower, a proposed skyscraper planned in Boston, Massachusetts
West Hollywood Gateway Project, a shopping center in West Hollywood, California
Gateway Center (Pinellas Park), an office park and development in Pinellas Park, Florida, which includes an Army Reserve-Florida National Guard joint training facility
Gateway Center (Brooklyn), a shopping complex in Brooklyn, New York
Bronx Terminal Market, a shopping center in the western Bronx, New York formerly known as "Gateway Center"
Gateway Transportation Center, a station in St. Louis, Missouri

See also
 The Gateway (disambiguation)